Anthony Friday Ittner (October 8, 1837 – February 22, 1931) was a nineteenth-century politician and brick manufacturer from Missouri.

Biography
Born in Lebanon, Ohio, Ittner moved to St. Louis, Missouri with his parents in 1844 where he attended common schools as a child. He learned the trade of bricklaying and later engaged in brick manufacturing. He was a member of the Enrolled Missouri Militia, was a member of the St. Louis City Council in 1867 and 1868 and was a member of the Missouri House of Representatives from 1868 to 1870. Ittner served in the Missouri Senate from 1870 to 1876 and was elected a Republican to the United States House of Representatives in 1876, serving from 1877 to 1879, declined to be a candidate for renomination in 1878. Afterward, he resumed work in brick manufacturing and was president of the National Association of Builders and of the National Brick Manufacturers' Association. Ittner retired from active business in 1917 and resided in St. Louis, Missouri until his death there on February 22, 1931. He was interred in Bellefontaine Cemetery in St. Louis.

A son, William B. Ittner became a noted architect.

External links

 Retrieved on 2009-03-23

 

1837 births
1931 deaths
Republican Party members of the Missouri House of Representatives
Republican Party Missouri state senators
Brick manufacturers
American bricklayers
Politicians from St. Louis
People from Lebanon, Ohio
People of Missouri in the American Civil War
Missouri State Guard
Members of the St. Louis Board of Aldermen
Burials at Bellefontaine Cemetery
Republican Party members of the United States House of Representatives from Missouri
19th-century American politicians